Feel The Noize – Greatest Hits is a compilation album by the British rock band Slade. It was released in January 1997 and reached No. 19 in the UK charts, remaining in the charts for six weeks. The success of the compilation encouraged other bands of the Glam Rock era to release their own 'Greatest Hits' packages. At the time, a resurgence in Seventies music was happening, due to the constant mentions from Blur's Damon Albarn and Oasis's Noel Gallagher.

Track listing

Critical reception

Stephen Thomas Erlewine of AllMusic wrote: "A fine collection including many tracks from Slade's hitmaking heyday, Feel the Noize: Greatest Hits stretches from the group's hit singles of the early '70s beginning with 1971's "Get Down and Get with It" all the way to 1991's "Radio Wall of Sound." In between those two songs is a selection of the group's big, dumb, irresistible, and misspelled hits. It also features latter-day hits like "My Oh My," but Slade never got better than they did at their stomping glitter-rock peak, and Feel the Noize captures the essence of that era."

Chart performance

Personnel
Slade
Noddy Holder – lead vocals, rhythm guitar, producer (tracks 15-16)
Dave Hill – lead guitar, backing vocals, producer (tracks 15-16)
Jim Lea – bass, piano, violin, keyboards, backing vocals, producer (tracks 15-16, 20)
Don Powell – drums, producer (tracks 15-16)

Additional personnel
Chas Chandler - producer (tracks 1-14, 21)
John Punter - producer (tracks 17-19)

References

1997 greatest hits albums
Slade compilation albums
Polydor Records compilation albums